Álvaro Ulcué Chocué (July 16, 1943 – November 10, 1984) was a Colombian Catholic priest and a member of the Paez people that became an activist in the defense of the rights of his people, as well as ethnic minorities and poor people of his country. He used to denounce cases of violence and abuses of power, especially during his homilies. His intention to organize his people to recover the ancestral lands, created tensions with landowners that accused him of uprising. He was murdered by two men on November 10, 1984 in Santander de Quilichao. The crime remains unpunished.

Life 

He was the son of María Soledad Chocué Peña and José Domingo Ulcué Yajué, who was governor of the Indigenous Council. Ulcué could start his formal education only when he was 11 in the school of Pueblo Nuevo, Caldono, Cauca. The school was run by the nuns founded by Mother Laura. He finished his primary at the Indocrespo, a residence for Catholic indigenous young people in Guadarrama (Antioquia Department) intended to ordain indigenous clergy in Colombia. He continued his education at the Minor Seminar of Popayán run by the Congregation of the Most Holy Redeemer, but after 4 years, he had to stop due to financial problems. He became teacher first in San Benito Abad (Sucre) and then at his own indigenous shelter in Cauca. But the Archdioceses and the sisters of Mother Laura helped him to finish his dream to become a priest and they paid the studies at the Seminary of Popayán. He finished theology in the seminary of Ibagué.

Priesthood 

Ulcué was ordained as a priest on July 10, 1973 in Popayán. He celebrated his first Mass in Pueblo Nuevo, at the side of his Paez people, an event that got the attention of the time, because it was the first time that an indigenous man became a Catholic priest in Colombia. In the occasion he said: "In the Seminar we began 62 and now we reached only three: Tomás Mina a black, Joel Ortiz, a farmer and me, an indigenous. This is the fulfillment of the prophecy that God chooses the humble to confuse the powerful."

But his ministry would not be easy: sensible to the suffering of his own people, especially with the problem of lost of ancestral lands before landowners, he became an object of persecution. He received several threats, especially during the 1980s. First it was his own family that was object of violence: in unclear events his own sister, Gloria, an uncle, Serafín and other Paez persons, were murdered. His own father was wounded in events where the Colombian Police was involved. After the funeral of his sister and uncle, soldiers searched at his house.

At the end of 1982 the indigenous communities denounced the threats against Fr. Ulcué, stating that the landowners had put a price to his head. He was not intimidated and he did a travel in 1983 to visit other indigenous communities in Colombia and Ecuador, including Afro-Colombians, also victims of discrimination and abuse.

The conflict of López Adentro 

The most difficult part came in 1984 with the conflict of López Adentro, a part of the Corinto Paez territory that was expropriated by landowners. Fr. Ulcué participated in a peaceful recovery of the land on January 25, an action that was answered by a violent participation of Police and Army with the death of 5 indigenous, among them a girl of 7 years old. Fr. Ulcué was active providing humanitarian assistance to wounded people and he celebrated a Mass on the site of the recovered land.

On November 8 of that same year, the Ministry of Defense, General Oscar Botero Restrepo, visited the troops with other two generals, Ariza and Diaz. Fr. Ulcué invited them to his Parish to discuss about the accusations made by the military against his person that were saying that he was promoting the communities to invade private property. He explained to Min Botero the rights of the indigenous peoples to their ancestral lands and the legal character of their claims to recover the indigenous shelters.

At the following day of that meeting, on November 9, the army and the police invaded the land of López Adentro, burned 150 indigenous houses and destroyed with machines 300 hectares of farming. "The government will always be at the side of the powerful, to defend their interests, but the interests of the poor must be defended by the same organized communities," he said when he knew the news. "I invite all Christians and other indigenous companions to rise our voices of protest and to condemn these events as contrary to the Law of God," he asked.

Murder 

On Saturday, November 10, 1984 at 8:30 AM, in Santander de Quilichao, Fr. Ulcué was attacked by two men in a motorbike when he was driving. He left the car and fell to the ground alive. The two criminals returned and shot him once more. Some nuns nearby brought him to the hospital, but he died few minutes after. Nobody has been prosecuted for this crime. On August 14, 1996, 12 years after, the Colombian Institute for Land Reform, Incora, reestablished the indigenous shelter of Corinto, with the same details claimed by Fr. Ulcué, including the land of López Adentro.

See also

References 

 Beltrán Peña, Francisco y Lucila Mejía Salazar 1989: La Utopía mueve montañas. Editorial Nueva América, Bogotá. 
 Roattino, Ezio 1985: Álvaro Ulcué Chocué Nasa Pal. Sangre india para una tierra nueva. CINEP, Bogotá.
 Hugo García Segura (2014). El legado de Álvaro Ulcué Chocué. El Espectador, 12 de noviembre de 2014. Enlace rescatado el 2 de abril de 2015 de http://www.elespectador.com/noticias/nacional/el-legado-de-alvaro-ulcue-chocue-articulo-527124

1943 births
1984 deaths
People from Cauca Department
20th-century Colombian Roman Catholic priests
Colombian people of indigenous peoples descent
Indigenous activists of the Americas
Assassinated activists
People murdered in Colombia